Phason is a quasiparticle existing in quasicrystals due to their specific, quasiperiodic lattice structure. Similar to phonon, phason is associated with atomic motion. However, whereas phonons are related to translation of atoms, phasons are associated with atomic rearrangements. As a result of these rearrangements, waves, describing the position of atoms in crystal, change phase, thus the term "phason".

A Phason can move faster than the speed of sound in the material and so gives a greater heat transfer rate (conduction) through the  material than one in which the transfer of heat is carried out only by phonons.

In the superspace picture, aperiodic crystals are obtained from the section of a periodic crystal of higher dimension (up to 6D) cut at an irrational angle. While phonons change the position atoms relative to the crystal structure in space, phasons change the position of atoms relative to the quasi-crystal structure and the cut through superspace that defines it. Phonon modes are therefore excitations of the "in plane" real (also called parallel or external) space whereas phasons are excitations of the perpendicular (also called internal) space.

The hydrodynamic theory of the quasicrystals predicts that the conventional (phonon) strain relaxes rapidly. On the contrary, relaxation of the phason strain is diffusive and is much slower. Therefore, metastable quasicrystals grown by rapid quenching from the melt exhibit built-in phason strain associated with shifts and anisotropic broadenings of X-ray and electron diffraction peaks.

References 

Freedman, B., Lifshitz, R., Fleischer, J. et al. Phason dynamics in nonlinear photonic quasicrystals. Nature Mater 6, 776–781 (2007). https://doi.org/10.1038/nmat1981

Books

See also 
Quasicrystal
Quasiparticle

Quasiparticles
Crystallography